State Route 36 (SR 36) is an east–west state highway in the U.S. state of California that is routed from U.S. Route 101 in Humboldt County to U.S. Route 395 just east of Susanville in Lassen County. The highway passes through Red Bluff, the county seat of Tehama County, on the northern edge of the Sacramento Valley. The portion of SR 36 travelling past Lassen Volcanic National Park and Lake Almanor is part of the Volcanic Legacy Scenic Byway, a National Scenic Byway.  Also, Route 36 between Alton and Susanville is a designated Blue Star Memorial Highway.

Route description

SR 36 begins in Alton at an interchange with U.S. Route 101.  It continues east through the communities of Hydesville and Carlotta before paralleling the Van Duzen River all the way to the town of Bridgeville. It passes near Mt. McClellan as it follows a curving path through the communities of Dinsmore and Cobbs, then enters Trinity National Forest.

Once in Trinity County, the highway veers away from the Van Duzen River, and crosses the Mad River before passing through the communities of Mad River and Forest Glen. The route briefly bends north to intersect with the southern terminus of SR 3 before turning east again and entering first Shasta County, where SR 36 passes through Wildwood and Platina, where it intersects CR A16 and leaves the forest, and enters Tehama County. SR 36 passes through Rosewood and later intersects CR A5 before entering the city of Red Bluff as Beegum Road. SR 36 continues south as Main Street into downtown Red Bluff before making a turn east as Oak Street, crossing the Sacramento River and coming to an interchange with I-5 before turning into Antelope Boulevard and passing the Tehama County Fairgrounds as it leaves the city limits.

SR 36 intersects the northern terminus of SR 99 and turns northeast at the intersection. Several miles later, SR 36 intersects CR A6 at the community of Dales before continuing east and passing through Paynes Creek. Eventually, SR 36 intersects SR 172 at the town of Mineral in the Lassen National Forest before running concurrently with SR 89. SR 89 and SR 36 intersect with the eastern terminus of SR 32 before crossing into Plumas County. Once the highway reaches the western shore of Lake Almanor, SR 89 continues southeast, while SR 36 passes through the community of Chester along the northern shore of Lake Almanor.

The route continues into Lassen County, where it intersects SR 147 and passes in between Lassen and Plumas National Forests. SR 36 intersects SR 44 before entering the city of Susanville as Hillcrest Road. The highway continues north briefly as Pine Street before becoming Main Street and continuing east through downtown Susanville and intersecting SR 139 and CR A27 before leaving the city limits. SR 36 ends at an intersection with U.S. Route 395 just southwest of Johnstonville.

SR 36 is part of the California Freeway and Expressway System, and east of SR 44 is part of the National Highway System, a network of highways that are considered essential to the country's economy, defense, and mobility by the Federal Highway Administration. SR 36 is eligible for the State Scenic Highway System, but it is not officially designated as a scenic highway by the California Department of Transportation. Both the SR 36/SR 86 concurrency, and the segment of SR 36 between SR 86 near Chester and SR 44 near Susanville, are part of the Volcanic Legacy Scenic Byway, a National Scenic Byway.

In popular culture
On the TV show Lost, during a flashback scene in the episode "Further Instructions," John Locke picks up a hitchhiker who happens to be an undercover police officer on State Route 36.

In author Robyn Carr's romantic novel series Virgin River, the fictional town of Virgin River is located off State Route 36 in the mountains of Humboldt County in Northern California.

In the New Zealand TV series 800 Words, a California 36 highway sign hangs on the wall of Big Mac's fight club (alongside one for Interstate 20).

Major intersections

See also

References

External links

AARoads - State Route 36
Caltrans: Route 36 highway conditions
California Highways: SR 36

036
State Route 036
State Route 036
State Route 036
State Route 036
State Route 036
State Route 036
Monuments and memorials in California
1934 establishments in California